In Greek mythology, Diogenia (Ancient Greek: Διογενείας) was the Athenian naiad-daughter of the river-god Cephisus and wife of Phrasimus. The couple had a daughter named Praxithea who married Erechtheus of Athens.

Note

References 

 Apollodorus, The Library with an English Translation by Sir James George Frazer, F.B.A., F.R.S. in 2 Volumes, Cambridge, MA, Harvard University Press; London, William Heinemann Ltd. 1921. ISBN 0-674-99135-4. Online version at the Perseus Digital Library. Greek text available from the same website.

Naiads
Children of Potamoi
Attican characters in Greek mythology